The 1987–88 Courage Area League North was the first full season of rugby union within the fourth tier of the English league system, currently known as National League 2 North, and was the counterpart to Courage Area League South (now National League 2 South). Each team played one match against the other teams, playing a total of ten matches each. There was no set date for matches, clubs having to arrange the fixtures among themselves.  Rugby were the first ever champions, gaining promotion to the 1988–89 National Division Three while Solihull, Derby and Birkenhead Park were the relegated sides.  Solihull and Derby dropped to Midlands 1 while Birkenhead Park fell into North 1.

Structure

Each team played one match against each of the other teams, playing a total of ten matches each.  The champions are promoted to National Division 3 and the bottom three teams were relegated to either North 1 or Midlands 1 depending on their locality.  The reason that there were three relegated teams (compared to the 1987–88 Courage Area League South) was that both teams relegated from National Division 3 were based in the northern section of the country.

Participating teams and locations

League table

Sponsorship
Area League North is part of the Courage Clubs Championship and was sponsored by Courage Brewery.

See also
 National League 2 North

References

N4
National League 2 North